Pierre Célestin Sabatier (born 1935 in Casablanca, Morocco), grand-nephew of François Nau, graduated from École Normale Supérieure, Paris in physics and mathematics in 1958 then spent a year in Princeton University where he was a pupil of Professor Eugene Wigner. He was awarded his doctorate at the Paris-Sud 11 University in 1966. He had worked on scattering theory, and, during the two years he had to serve in the French Navy, on coastal engineering and applied geophysics. His conclusions of the first interdisciplinary meeting on Inverse Problems  (published in  "Mathematics of Profile Inversion", L. Colin, Editor. NASA TM X-62, 1971) proved
to be correctly predictive up to now.
Professor Sabatier was President of the 20th section (nuclear and particle physics) of the Conseil supérieur des Universités (1976-1983; later called CNU, and where he served almost 20 years), the Founding Editor of the journal Inverse Problems, IOP, 1985-present, he initiated the RCP264 workshops in Montpellier, and is one of the foremost exponents of the field of inverse problems (see Inverse Problem). He published almost 200 articles and books, in domains going from pure mathematics to earth and ocean sciences, in particular the authoritative book on "Inverse Problems of Quantum Scattering Theory", coauthored with K.Chadan (2nd English Edition, Springer 1989), and the encyclopedic one on "Scattering", coedited with E. R. Pike (Academic Press 2002).

Distinguished Professor at Montpellier University, retired, Pierre Sabatier is Distinguished Lecturer in Physics of the University of Alberta (1993 -) and Doctor honoris causa of the University of Lecce (1992-), Fellow of the Institute of Physics (IOP), and currently serves in the boards of the two Journals "Inverse Problems" and "Inverse and ill-posed Problems". He recently published Memories in "Rêves et Combats d'un enseignant-chercheur. Retour Inverse." (L'Harmattan 2012).

References
 The following conference was organised by IOP in Bristol in 2014 in honor of the 30th anniversary of the journal Inverse Problems: http://ipta2014.iopconfs.org/home
 The following conference was organised by Professor Alfred Louis in Montpellier in 2015 as "the succession of the RCP 264 conferences, which shaped the international Inverse Problems community in the early days of this then emerging field of research. and in honor of Professor Sabatier's 80th year": http://ciip2015.informatik.uni-bremen.de
 

1935 births
French physicists
Living people